Kamra (Urdu: کامرہ) is a town located in Attock District in the mountainous north of Punjab, Pakistan. It is located on 33°51′N 72°24′E

Pakistan Aeronautical Complex, PAF Base Minhas and many such type of institutes are present here.

Schools 
Air University, Aviation and Avionics Campus, Kamra
The City School Kamra
Bloomfield Hall School Kamra

References

Villages in Attock District